In relativistic quantum mechanics and quantum field theory, the Joos–Weinberg equation is a relativistic wave equations applicable to free particles of arbitrary spin , an integer for bosons or half-integer for fermions. The solutions to the equations are wavefunctions, mathematically in the form of multi-component spinor fields.

It is named after H. Joos and Steven Weinberg, found in the early 1960s.

Statement

Introducing a  matrix;

symmetric in any two tensor indices, which generalizes the gamma matrices in the Dirac equation, the equation is

or

Lorentz group structure

For the JW equations the representation of the Lorentz group is

This representation has definite spin . It turns out that a spin  particle in this representation satisfy field equations too. These equations are very much like the Dirac equations. It is suitable when the symmetries of charge conjugation, time reversal symmetry, and parity are good.

The representations  and  can each separately represent particles of spin . A state or quantum field in such a representation would satisfy no field equation except the Klein–Gordon equation.

Lorentz covariant tensor description of Weinberg–Joos states

The six-component spin-1 representation space,

can be labeled by a pair of anti-symmetric Lorentz indexes, meaning that it transforms as an antisymmetric Lorentz tensor of second rank  i.e.

The j-fold Kronecker product  of 

decomposes into a finite series of Lorentz-irreducible representation spaces according to

and necessarily contains a  sector.

where  are constant  matrices defining the elements of the Lorentz algebra within the  representations. The Capital Latin letter labels indicate the finite dimensionality of the representation spaces under consideration which describe the internal angular momentum (spin) degrees of freedom.

Here we define:

to be the  eigenvalue of the  sector. Using this notation we define the projector operator,  in terms of :

This algorithm is free from auxiliary conditions.

has to be considered. The choice of the totally antisymmetric Lorentz tensor of second rank, in the above equation is only optional. It is possible to start with multiple Kronecker products of totally symmetric second rank Lorentz tensors, . The latter option should be of interest in theories where high-spin  Joos–Weinberg fields preferably couple to symmetric tensors, such as the metric tensor in gravity.

An Example 

The

transforming in the Lorenz tensor spinor of second rank,

The  generators express in terms of the generators in the four-vector,

as

Then, the explicit expression for the Casimir invariant  in  takes the form,

and the Lorentz projector on (3/2,0)⊕(0,3/2) is given by,

In effect, the (3/2,0)⊕(0,3/2) degrees of freedom, denoted by

are found to solve the following second order equation,

Expressions for the solutions can be found in.

See also

Higher-dimensional gamma matrices
Bargmann–Wigner equations, alternative equations which describe free particles of any spin
Higher spin theory

References

Quantum mechanics
Quantum field theory
Mathematical physics